HBS Tech Conference (Formally named "Cyberposium") is the largest MBA technology and media conference in the world.  Held at Harvard Business School since 1992, the conference draws some 1,300 attendees from the tech industry as well as from the VC and startup communities.  Held on the campus of HBS, the Tech Conference is the primary campus event of Harvard Business School's Tech Club.

The 2017 conference was held on Saturday, September 16, 2017, on the school's campus in Boston.

History

External links
 Tech Conference HBS Website
 Tech Club at Harvard Business School

Harvard University
Technology conferences